Rahul Jaiswal (born 22 October 1991) is an Indian footballer playing for United Sikkim.

Career

United Sikkim
Jaiswal made his debut for United Sikkim F.C. on 22 September 2012 during an Indian Federation Cup match against Salgaocar F.C. at the JRD Tata Sports Complex in Jamshedpur, Jharkhand in which he was in Starting 11; United Sikkim lost the match 0–3.

Career statistics

Club
Statistics accurate as of 12 May 2013

References 

United Sikkim F.C. players
1991 births
Living people
Place of birth missing (living people)
Indian footballers
Association football defenders